The 2022 Orlando City B season is the club's fifth season of existence and their first since returning from hiatus during the 2021 season. It is the debut season as a founding member of MLS Next Pro after most recently competing in USL League One.

Martín Perelman was appointed head coach on March 9, 2022.

Roster

Competitions

MLS Next Pro 

For the 2022 season, MLS Next Pro is split into four divisions across two conferences. Orlando were placed in the Central Division of the Eastern Conference. In total, eight teams will qualify for the playoffs: the four divisional winners plus the two teams with the next most points in each conference. In the event a match is tied after 90 minutes, each team will receive a single point with an additional bonus point awarded to the winner of a penalty shootout.

Match results

Standings
Eastern Conference

Overall table

References 

Orlando City B
Orlando City B
Orlando City B seasons
Orlando City B